Vicary Gibbs may refer to:

 Vicary Gibbs (judge) (1751–1820), English barrister, judge and politician
 Vicary Gibbs, 6th Baron Aldenham (born 1948), British peer
 Vicary Gibbs (St Albans MP) (1853–1932), British barrister, merchant, politician, and editor